Maayan Keret (born April 24, 1976) is an Israeli model, actress, entrepreneur, lecturer, and activist. She had founded the Your Runway organization, which leads workshops for girls about body image and self esteem. Keret said she was raped at the age of 12. Since then, she has been harassed or assaulted so many times she “stopped counting.”

A successful model at only 17 years old, Keret was featured in fashion magazines such as Vogue, Elle, and Marie Claire. Keret worked with leading designers such as Yves Saint Laurent, Marc Jacobs, Calvin Klein, and Donna Karan. She is known for her non-traditional perspectives on how the female body should be represented in Israel’s media.

Keret became known for outspoken criticism of the manner in which models are treated and the harsh conditions under which they often work.

Keret wrote and published The Beautiful Women, a non-fiction book with real-life narratives of models and actresses who have struggled with eating disorders and body image issues. Keret said she had developed an eating disorder after she "felt a lot of pressure from everyone" to continually lose weight.

References

1976 births
Living people
Israeli female models
Israeli non-fiction writers